General elections were held in Venezuela on 1 December 1963. The presidential elections were won by Raúl Leoni of the Democratic Action political party, who received 32.8% of the vote. Leoni's party won 66 of the 179 seats in the Chamber of Deputies and 22 of the 47 seats in the Senate. Voter turnout was 92.3% in the presidential election and 90.8% in the Congressional elections.

Results

President

Congress

References

1963 in Venezuela
Venezuela
Elections in Venezuela
Presidential elections in Venezuela
December 1963 events in South America